Hurricane Season is the first studio album by Alkaline Trio vocalist and bassist Dan Andriano, released on August 9, 2011 through Asian Man Records. The album is primarily acoustic, and was met with positive critical reception, being given a 4.5/5 by PunkNews, and a 4/5 by Alternative Press.

From This Oil Can borrows lyrics from I Remember A Rooftop, a song Andriano wrote for Alkaline Trio's acoustic album Damnesia.

Track listing

References 

Dan Andriano albums
2011 albums